Tremblay is an O-Train station on the Confederation Line in Ottawa, Ontario which serves the Ottawa train station, connecting to Via Rail Corridor inter-city rail services and a daily Ontario Northland bus service to Sudbury and Sault Ste. Marie. The station opened on September 14, 2019 to replace the former Transitway bus rapid transit station known as Train Station (which closed on June 28, 2015).

Location

Tremblay station is located south of Tremblay Road and directly west of Via Rail Ottawa station. The Ottawa train station entrance is less than a 5 minute walk from the Confederation Line LRT train platforms on Level 1. While the stations are close to each other, the two buildings are not linked and transferring passengers are required to walk outside between them. 

North of the station is the Max Keeping Pedestrian Bridge, which crosses Highway 417, allowing access to RCGT Park (a minor-league baseball stadium) as well as the Courtyard by Marriott Ottawa East and Hampton Inn by Hilton Ottawa west of the stadium parking lot. These two hotels are the closest to the station, and are linked to each other by the Ottawa Conference and Event Centre. All of these are accessible within a 12-15 minute walk. Tremblay is the one of only stations that do not always have bus connections in all time periods.

Layout

Tremblay is a side platform station located at grade in a cutting. The station's single entrance building, located at the same level and opposite the railway station entrance, contains the ticket barrier and exits onto a plaza. 

The station's artwork is entitled National Garden, an installation by Jyhling Lee. A series of canopies on the plaza outside the station entrance features silhouettes of flowering plants seemingly cut out of the reflective material of the canopy ceilings and folded down to produce a suspended garden.

Service

The following routes serve Tremblay as of October 6, 2019:

References

External links
OC Transpo station page
OC Transpo Area map

 

Confederation Line stations
1987 establishments in Ontario
Railway stations in Canada opened in 2019
2019 establishments in Ontario